Under the Lighthouse Dancing is a 1997 Australian romantic drama film directed by Graeme Rattigan and starring Jack Thompson, Jacqueline McKenzie, and Naomi Watts. It is based on a true story.

Premise
Three couples travel to Rottnest Island near Perth, Western Australia for the weekend. One of the couples announces that they intend to get married and when the bride-to-be tells the others that she is terminally ill, they make sure the wedding takes place that weekend.

Cast
 Jack Thompson as Henry
 Jacqueline McKenzie as Emma
 Naomi Watts as Louise
 Philip Holder as Garth
 Zoe Bertram as Juliet
 Aden Gillett as David
 Michael Loney as Father Flynn

Reception
Writing for Variety, David Stratton praised the acting and production design of the film, but said that it had thin material, and that the ending was "hokey".

Australia's SBS gave the film a negative review concluding that the production "obviously wants to have an emotional impact, it just hasn't done it very successfully."

Box office
Under the Lighthouse Dancing grossed $30,321 at the box office in Australia.

See also
Cinema of Australia

References

External links

 

1997 films
Australian romantic drama films
Rottnest Island
1997 romantic drama films
Films about cancer
Films scored by Nerida Tyson-Chew
Films set on islands
Films about weddings
1990s English-language films
1990s Australian films